Llorenç may refer to:

People
Joan Llorenç (1458–1520), the leader of a germania (guild, literally "brotherhood") of Valencia
Llorenç Gómez (born 1991), Spanish beach soccer player
Llorenç Vidal Vidal, majorcan poet, educator and pacifist who founded the School Day of Non-violence and Peace (DENIP) in 1964

Places named after Saint Lawrence
Sant Lloren%C3%A7 d'Hortons, municipality in the comarca of Alt Penedès, Barcelona, Catalonia, Spain
Sant Llorenç de la Muga, town in the Alt Empordà comarca, in Girona province, Catalonia, Spain
Sant Llorenç de Morunys, municipality in the comarca of the Solsonès in Catalonia, Spain
Sant Llorenç del Munt, largely rocky mountain massif in central Catalonia, Spain
Sant Llorenç des Cardassar, small municipality on Majorca, one of the Balearic Islands, Spain
Sant Llorenç Savall, municipality of the shire of Vallès Occidental
Church of Sant Llorenç, Lleida, Romanesque church in Lleida (Catalonia, Spain) dating from the late 12th century